Timeless is Hong Kong Mandopop artist Khalil Fong's cover album. It was released on August 11, 2009.

In Timeless, Khalil selected 10 classic songs to cover, including Stevie Wonder’s “You Are The Sunshine Of My Life”, Glenn Medeiros’s Nothing's Gonna Change My Love for You, Michael Jackson’s Bad, Ray Charles’s Georgia on My Mind and Eric Clapton’s Wonderful Tonight. Apart from English songs, he covered the Mandarin classics like Faye Wong’s Red Bean and A-mei’s Remember. He also recorded and released his first Cantonese song, Kuang Chao (Violent Tides) (originally sung by Susanna Kwan).

Track listing

References

External links
 Khalil Fong Website
 Itunes

2012 albums
Khalil Fong albums